The Tabakini monastery of St. George is a monastery located west of Georgia, in the upper part of Imereti, 7-8 kilometers from the city of Zestafoni.

History 
The construction of the monastery has been dated between the seventh and eighth centuries. Tabakinsky is known for its special architecture, rich history and 16th-century murals. The monastery, where 70 monks worked at a time, made a great contribution to the country's history. Here, an outstanding ascetic of the 19th century, Hilarion Kartveli, spent part of his childhood. Under the communist regime, the monastery was ransacked and destroyed. 

The old part consists of a church with two naves with a crypt and a side chapel, built in the seventh and eighth centuries. The church was painted during the first half of the 16th century and has a bell tower from a later period. The monastery retains the image of King Bagrat III of Imereti (1510-1565).

In 1980-1986, the temple was restored. In the 90s of the 20th century, a house for monks was built.

References

Literature 

 Georgian Soviet Encyclopedia, Vol. 9, p. 633, Tb., 1985.

Georgian Orthodox monasteries